Hercules, Prisoner of Evil is a 1964 Italian peplum film directed by Anthony Dawson and an uncredited Ruggero Deodato. Deodato, the official assistant director, replaced Margheriti as he was busy with the completion of the film The Fall of Rome. Deodato actually directed most of the film in actuality but Margheriti was credited as the director. The film is filled with a variety of horrific themes and elements, featuring a killer werewolf, and is as much a horror film as it is a peplum.

Plot 
The mighty Ursus is given a potion to drink that transforms him on certain nights into a murderous werewolf. Ursus kills several innocent people in the forest before realizing that he himself is the creature the local villagers are seeking to destroy. Ursus is referred to as Hercules in the English-dubbed prints.

Cast 
Reg Park as Ursus
Mireille Granelli as Aniko
Ettore Manni as Ido
Furio Meniconi as Zereteli
 Maria Teresa Orsini as Kato
 Lilly Mantovani as slave
 Serafino Fuscagni as Mico
 Ugo Carboni
 Claudio Scarchilli
 Gaetano Quartararo
 Giulio Maculani

Release
Hercules, Prisoner of Evil was released in Italy on July 31, 1964.

References

Sources

External links

1964 films
1960s fantasy films
Italian fantasy films
Peplum films
Films directed by Antonio Margheriti
Films directed by Ruggero Deodato
Sword and sandal films
1960s Italian-language films
1960s Italian films